Sree Kulathoor Kolathukara Shiva Temple is a Hindu temple located in Thiruvananthapuram in the Indian state of Kerala, in 1893. The temple was built at the request of Narayana Guru in 1915.

References

Hindu temples in Thiruvananthapuram
Shiva temples in Kerala